Samuel Larsson Stjerneld (1637–1716) was son of Lars Gustafsson Vasa and Brita Törnros.

In unknown year Samuel espoused an Englishwoman, Brita Ratskin (her mother a Sydney), a learned woman, who spoke Latin, understood Greek, and died in childbirth.
They had daughter Catharina Stjerneld.

In 1682 he married Margaretha Bethzen, daughter of Dutch merchant Mathias.

Sources

House of Vasa
1716 deaths
1637 births